Year 431 (CDXXXI) was a common year starting on Thursday (link will display the full calendar) of the Julian calendar. At the time, it was known as the Year of the Consulship of Bassus and Antiochus (or, less frequently, year 1184 Ab urbe condita). The denomination 431 for this year has been used since the early medieval period, when the Anno Domini calendar era became the prevalent method in Europe for naming years.

Events 
 By place 
 Roman Empire 
 Flavius Aetius, Roman general (magister militum), fights a campaign in Rhaetia (Switzerland) and Noricum (Austria). He is attested in the city of Vindelicia (modern Augsburg), reestablishing Roman rule on the Danube frontier. 
 Aetius pushes the Salian Franks back across the River Somme. King Chlodio signs a peace treaty and becomes a foederatus of the Western Roman Empire.

 Africa 
 Hippo Regius becomes the capital of the Vandal Kingdom. After 14 months of hunger and disease, the Vandals ravage the city. Emperor Theodosius II sends an imperial fleet with an army under command of Aspar, and lands at Carthage.
 Aspar is routed by the Vandals and Flavius Marcian, future Byzantine emperor, is captured during the fighting. He negotiates a peace with King Genseric and maintains imperial authority in Carthage.

 Central America 
March 10 – K'uk' B'alam I, the first known ruler of the Mayan city-state of Palenque what is now the state of Chiapas in southern Mexico, comes to power and reigns until his death four years later in 435.
 Possible date of the  Tierra Blanca Joven (TBJ) eruption of the Ilopango caldera in central El Salvador.

 By topic 
 Arts and Sciences 
 Greek Neoplatonist philosopher Proclus begins studying at the Academy in Athens.

 Religion 
 June – First Council of Ephesus: Nestorianism is rejected, the Nicene creed is declared to be complete. Nestorius is deposed from his see.
 October 1 – Maximianus is enthroned as Patriarch of Constantinople.
 Pope Celestine I dispatches Palladius to serve as bishop to the Irish.

Births 
 Anastasius I, emperor of the Byzantine Empire (approximate date)
 Odoacer, first "barbarian" king of Italy (d. 493)

Deaths 
 June 22 – Paulinus of Nola, Christian bishop and poet (b. 354)
 Qifu Mumo, prince of the Chinese Xianbei state Western Qin

References